The Drayton Valley Western Review is a weekly newspaper serving the Drayton Valley, Alberta area in Canada. First published in 1965 succeeding an earlier short lived paper Drayton Valley Banner.

See also
List of newspapers in Canada

References

External links
Drayton Valley Western Review

Weekly newspapers published in Alberta